Van Buskirk-Oakley House is located in Oradell, Bergen County, New Jersey, United States. The house was built in 1834 and was added to the National Register of Historic Places on July 3, 1979.

See also
National Register of Historic Places listings in Bergen County, New Jersey

References

Houses on the National Register of Historic Places in New Jersey
Federal architecture in New Jersey
Houses completed in 1834
Houses in Bergen County, New Jersey
National Register of Historic Places in Bergen County, New Jersey
Oradell, New Jersey
New Jersey Register of Historic Places